YMCA Centenary School & College in Allahabad, Uttar Pradesh, India, was founded in 1992 after the centenary of YMCA Allahabad was observed. It was established by Late.B.T. Masih who appointed his son Late.Anurag Masih as the Principal from the year 2003 to 2008. After his sad demise, the founder Director Mr. B.T. Masih served as officiating Principal and later on designated Mrs.Vasudha Masih (the daughter in law) as Deputy Director Administration and Ms.Reema Masih as the Principal.   The current principal is Ma'am Reema Masih. The president of YMCA is Rev. Rajesh A.K. Joseph. It is affiliated to the Central Board of Secondary Education, Allahabad.  YMCA's symbol is an inverted Red Triangle; all the three sides of which are equal, and these three sides represent physical, mental and spiritual development of individual.

External links 
Website

Schools in Allahabad
Educational institutions established in 1992
1992 establishments in Uttar Pradesh
Universities and colleges founded by the YMCA